Črnkovci is a village in the municipality of Marijanci, Osijek-Baranja County, Croatia.

Name
The name of the village in Croatian is plural.